Ciara Anna Gamboa Sotto (born July 2, 1980) is a Filipina actress and singer.

Personal life
She is the youngest daughter of actress Helen Gamboa-Sotto and actor and Senator Vicente Sotto III. She is a first cousin of Sharon Cuneta (their mothers are sisters) and an aunt to KC Concepcion. She is also cousins with Oyo Boy Sotto, as well as Pasig Mayor Vico Sotto.

In 2010, Sotto married businessman Jojo Oconer, with whom she has a son.

Career
At age six, Sotto made her first appearance on Eat Bulaga! and became one of the show's regular hosts from 2005 to 2012. Before she became a regular host at Eat Bulaga, she was a member of T.G.I.S., produced by Viva Television and GMA Network. During her teenage years, Sotto together with cousin Danica Sotto and Jocas de Leon, had a regular Saturday production number in Eat Bulaga!. They were dubbed as the "Ang TVJ (Tito, Vic and Joey) Kids". During her stint in Eat Bulaga!, she was paired with co-host Paolo Ballesteros and were together dubbed "CiaPao".

In 2008, Sotto launched her album entitled If You Love Me. She said that she was involved in different aspects of the album's production. The album contains songs written by her father, Tito, with her uncle, Vic Sotto along with Joey de Leon doing the back-up vocals of one song. It was Sotto's second album and it is produced and was distributed by Sony BMG Music.

Filmography

Television

Films

References

External links

Show website

1980 births
ABS-CBN personalities
GMA Network personalities
Star Magic
Viva Artists Agency
Filipino child actresses
Filipino television actresses
Filipino people of American descent
Filipino people of Chinese descent
Filipino people of Spanish descent
Living people
Singers from Makati
Cebuano people
Visayan people
Tagalog people
Ciara
21st-century Filipino singers
21st-century Filipino women singers